The Michigan Radio Network (or MRN) was a satellite-distributed news service that provides actualities, newscasts, and talk shows to affiliates in Michigan. It was most recently owned by Learfield Communications and had headquarters in Lansing, Michigan. Over the years MRN had been around in various forms and names, and is a sister network to the Michigan Farm Radio Network.

History
The Michigan Radio Network can trace its roots to the Michigan Regional Network, the first radio network in Michigan.

The modern incarnation of the Michigan Radio Network began in 1970 with the formation of the Michigan Farm Radio Network (MFRN) in Milan. The network that came to be known as the Michigan Radio Network was first called the Michigan News Network (MNN). The MFRN and MNN were owned by a company called the Great Lakes Radio group, headed up by Jim Rayl.

The Michigan News Network split from the Great Lakes Radio group in the 1980s and moved to Caro. The MNN was bought by former Detroit Tiger Denny McLain and headquarters moved to Lansing. McLain, convicted of embezzlement and stealing from workers pensions, went bankrupt. The network was sold to back to Jim Rayl, still called the Michigan News Network, and now owned by Full Circle Broadcasting.

Full Circle sold the MNN to Grosse Pointe Farms based Saga Communications, headed by Ed Christian. The name of the network was changed to the Michigan Radio Network.

The Michigan Radio Network (MRN) and MFRN was sold to Learfield Communications in December, 2014.

In March 2016, it was announced that Learfield would end the Michigan Radio Network on March 31 due to financial reasons, and sell MRN's Lansing studios.

Programs
 Michigan Radio Network News, hourly one and two-minute newscasts.
 Michigan Radio Network Sports, morning and afternoon sports updates.
 Capital Pressroom with Rob Baykian, a thirty-minute weekly public affairs program.
 Outdoor Magazine with Mike Avery, a three-hour weekend program about hunting and fishing, originating from WSGW.

Special events
The Michigan Radio Network covered events related to the Michigan Legislature, including the annual State of the State address and election night coverage.

Affiliates

WAAM, Ann Arbor
WAGN (AM), Menominee
WAKV, Otsego
WATT, Cadillac
WATZ-FM, Alpena
WBCH (AM), Hastings
WBCK, Battle Creek
WBCM (FM), Boyne City
WBMI, West Branch
WBRN (AM), Big Rapids
WCBY, Cheboygan

WCCW-FM, Traverse City
WCCY, Houghton
WCSY-FM, South Haven
WDBC, Escanaba
WDMJ, Marquette
WGHN (AM), Grand Haven
WGLM, Greenville
WHTO, Iron Mountain
WHYB, Menominee
WIDL, Caro

WILS, Lansing
WIOS, Tawas City
WKHM (AM), Jackson
WKJC, Tawas City
WKYO, Caro
WLDN, Ludington
WMOM, Pentwater
WNBY (AM), Newberry
WNGE, Negaunee
WPHM, Port Huron
WQXO, Munising

WRCI, Three Rivers
WRGZ, Rogers City
WSAQ, Port Huron
WSGW (AM), Saginaw
WSOO, Sault Ste Marie
WTIQ, Manistique
WTKG, Grand Rapids
WUPY, Ontonagon
WXLA, Lansing
WZTK, Alpena

References

Defunct radio networks in the United States
Radio stations disestablished in 2016
Defunct mass media in Michigan